Arki Assembly constituency is one of the 68 constituencies in the Himachal Pradesh Legislative Assembly of Himachal Pradesh a northern state of India. Arki is a part of Shimla Lok Sabha constituency.

Members of Legislative Assembly

Election candidate

2022

Election results

2021 by-election 
The sitting MLA, Virbhadra Singh died on 8 July 2021. The Election Commission of India announced that by-elections for the vacant constituencies would be done on 30 October 2021.

2017

See also
 Solan district
 List of constituencies of Himachal Pradesh Legislative Assembly
Arki Fort

References

External links
 

Assembly constituencies of Himachal Pradesh
Solan district